Colin Fleming and Ross Hutchins were the defending champions, but decided not to participate.

Konstantin Kravchuk and Denys Molchanov won the title, defeating Arnau Brugués-Davi and Malek Jaziri 7–6(7–4), 6–7(1–7), [10–3] in the final.

Seeds

  Mikhail Kukushkin /  Vitali Reshetnikov (quarterfinals)
  Konstantin Kravchuk /  Denys Molchanov (champions)
  Karol Beck /  Lukáš Lacko (semifinals)
  Sergey Betov /  Vishnu Vardhan (quarterfinals)

Draw

Draw

References
 Main Draw

President's Cup (tennis) - Doubles
2011 Men's Doubles